This is a complete list of works by American science fiction and fantasy author Jack Vance.

Works

Fantasy

The Dying Earth

 The Dying Earth (author's preferred title: Mazirian the Magician, collection of linked stories, 1950)
 The Eyes of the Overworld (author's preferred title: Cugel the Clever, novel 1966)
 Cugel's Saga (author's preferred title: Cugel: The Skybreak Spatterlight, novel, 1983)
The Laughing Magician (omnibus containing The Eyes of the Overworld and Cugel's Saga, 2007)
 Rhialto the Marvellous (collection of linked stories, 1984)

Lyonesse

 Lyonesse: Suldrun's Garden (1983) (also titled Lyonesse and Suldrun's Garden)
 Lyonesse: The Green Pearl (1985) (also titled The Green Pearl)
 Lyonesse: Madouc (1989) (also titled Madouc)

Science fiction

The Demon Princes Series

 The Star King (1964)
 The Killing Machine (1964)
 The Palace of Love (1967)
 The Face (1979)
 The Book of Dreams (1981)

The Cadwal Chronicles

 Araminta Station (1987)
 Ecce and Old Earth (1991)
 Throy (1992)

Alastor

 Trullion: Alastor 2262 (1973)
 Marune: Alastor 933 (1975)
 Wyst: Alastor 1716 (1978)
 Both The Gray Prince and Maske: Thaery have backgrounds in the Alastor Cluster.

Durdane

 The Anome (alternate title: The Faceless Man, 1973)
 The Brave Free Men (1973)
 The Asutra (1974)

Tschai

 City of the Chasch (author's preferred title: The Chasch. 1968)
 Servants of the Wankh (reissue title: The Wannek, 1969)
 The Dirdir (1969)
 The Pnume (1970)

Non-series science fiction novels
 The Five Gold Bands (alternate title: The Space Pirate, author's preferred title: The Rapparee) (1953)
 Vandals of the Void (young adult novel) (1953)
 To Live Forever (1956)
 Big Planet (1957)
 The Languages of Pao (1958)
 Slaves of the Klau (original title: Planet of the Damned; alternate title preferred by Vance: Gold and Iron) (1958)
 Space Opera (1965)
 The Blue World (1966)
 Emphyrio (1969)
 The Gray Prince (author's preferred title: The Domains of Koryphon) (1974)
 Showboat World (author's preferred title: The Magnificent Showboats of the Lower Vissel River, Lune XXIII, Big Planet) (1975)
 Maske: Thaery (1976)
 Night Lamp (1996)
 Ports of Call (1998)
 Lurulu (2004) — sequel to Ports of Call, completing a short multi-part novel

Selected novellas

 "Overlords of Maxus" (1951 February issue of Thrilling Wonder Stories)
 "Son of the Tree" (1951; reissued as a novel in 1964)
 "Abercrombie Station" and its sequel "Cholwell's Chickens" (both 1952; two novellas later issued as Monsters in Orbit in 1965)
 "Telek" (1952)
 "The Houses of Iszm" (1954; reissued as a novel in 1964)
 "The Miracle Workers", (1958)
 "The Moon Moth" (1961)
 "Gateway to Strangeness" (1962) (also titled "Dust of Far Suns" and "Sail 25")
 "The Dragon Masters" (1963 - Hugo Award Winner)
 "The Brains of Earth" (author's preferred title: "Nopalgarth") (1966)
 "The Last Castle" (1966, Nebula Award winner; illustrated by Alicia Austin in 1980)
 "Three-Legged Joe" (short story) (1953; featured in Startling Stories)
 "Dodkin's Job"

Mystery/thrillers
 Take My Face (1957), as "Peter Held"
 Isle of Peril (1957), as "Alan Wade" (also titled Bird Isle)
 Strange People, Queer Notions (1958)
 The Man In the Cage (1960)
 The Four Johns (1964), as "Ellery Queen" (also titled Four Men Called John, UK 1976)
 A Room to Die In (1965), as "Ellery Queen"
 The Fox Valley Murders (1966)
 The Madman Theory (1966), as "Ellery Queen"
 The Pleasant Grove Murders (1967)
 The Deadly Isles (1969)
 Bad Ronald (1973)
 The View from Chickweed's Window (1979)
 The House on Lily Street (1979)
 The Dark Ocean (1985)

Collections
 
 The World Between and Other Stories (1965)
 The Many Worlds of Magnus Ridolph (1966)
 Eight Fantasms and Magics (1969)
 The Worlds of Jack Vance (1973)
 Galactic Effectuator (this title is an editorial invention for the collected Miro Hetzel stories "Freitzke's Turn" and "The Dogtown Tourist Agency") (1980)
 Lost Moons (1982)
 The Narrow Land (1982)
 The Augmented Agent and Other Stories (1986)
 The Dark Side of the Moon (1986)
 Chateau D'If and Other Stories (1990)
 When the Five Moons Rise (1992)
 Tales of the Dying Earth (1999)
 The Jack Vance Treasury (2007), 
 Wild Thyme, Green Magic (2009)

Autobiography
This is Me, Jack Vance! (Subterranean Press, 2009) (won the 2010 Hugo Award, Best Related Book)

References

Bibliographies by writer
Bibliographies of American writers
Fantasy bibliographies
Science fiction bibliographies